Bombus ferganicus is a species of cuckoo bumblebee.

References

Insects described in 1893
Bumblebees